The 2011–12 TFF First League, also known as Bank Asya First League due to sponsoring reasons (in Turkish: Bank Asya 1. Lig), is the 11th season since the league was established in 2001 and 49th season of the second-level football league of Turkey since its establishment in 1963–64. The start date of the league was 14 August 2011 and end date is 13 May 2012.

Teams
Kasımpaşa, Bucaspor and Konyaspor relegated from Süper Lig after the 31st week games of 2011–12 Süper Lig. Mersin İdman Yurdu, Samsunspor and Orduspor promoted to 2011–12 Süper Lig.

Göztepe, Sakaryaspor and Elazığspor promoted from TFF Second League. Altay and Diyarbakırspor relegated to 2011–12 TFF Second League.

Team summaries

Managerial changes
Before the start of the season

After the start of the season

League table

Positions by round

Results

Promotion playoffs
The teams ranked third through sixth will compete in the promotion playoffs for the 2012–13 Süper Lig. The 3rd team and 6th team will play two matches in their own grounds. Likewise 4th and 5th teams will play two mathes elimination round. This round is named as semi-finals. Winner teams will play one final match at a neutral venue. Winner of the final will be third team to promote to Süper Lig 2012–2013.

Semi-finals 3–6

Semi-finals 4–5

Final

Season statistics

Top goalscorers

References

See also
 2011–12 Turkish Cup
 2011–12 Süper Lig
 2011–12 TFF Second League
 2011–12 TFF Third League

TFF First League seasons
Turkey
1